Jonathan Francis Kay (born 8 November 1969) is an English television presenter, newsreader, and journalist based in the West of England known for his work on BBC News.

Early life
Kay was born on 8 November 1969 and grew up in Cheshire, attending Abbey Gate College, an independent school in Chester. From the age of 18 he studied at the University of Exeter in Devon. During his studies there, he "mucked around" in the studios of University Radio Exeter, which led to his decision to pursue a career in broadcast journalism. After graduation with a BA degree in Politics in 1992, he joined the BBC as a trainee local reporter.

Journalism career
After periods at BBC local radio stations, Kay became a full-time reporter for BBC Radio Bristol, making an early documentary on the development of Bradley Stoke.

Kay worked as a regional reporter for BBC Points West and then moved to the capital as a national news correspondent for BBC London News. He is currently a news correspondent for BBC News covering the South-West of the country, but he regularly covers stories in other parts of Britain and around the world. In 2014, Kay reported from Portugal on the investigation into the disappearance of Madeleine McCann and from Cape Town on the trial of Shrien Dewani (later exonerated for his wife's murder). He was BBC News at Six correspondent during the London Olympics in 2012 and election correspondent during the 2015 general election campaign. Jon Kay is also a regular presenter on BBC Breakfast. In July 2022, it was announced by the BBC that Kay will become the main presenter of BBC Breakfast from Monday to Wednesday.

Personal life
Kay met fellow BBC trainee Francesca Kasteliz during their secondment to the newsroom in BBC Bristol. The couple married in 1998, and have three children. Having worked as a BBC presenting coach, Kasteliz now works as a freelance TV coach.

References

External links

1969 births
Living people
Journalists from Kingston upon Hull
Alumni of the University of Exeter
English television presenters
BBC newsreaders and journalists